Mashona Washington (born May 31, 1976) is a retired tennis player from the United States.

Her career-high singles ranking is No. 50, achieved on November 8, 2004. On July 18, 2005, she peaked at No. 55 in the doubles rankings. Washington retired from professional tennis in 2012, aged 36.

Biography
Washington attended high school in Michigan, moved to Delray Beach, Florida in her sophomore year, graduating from Lake Worth Christian School, Boynton Beach, Florida in 1994, and moved to Houston, Texas, in 1997.

She is the younger sister of Mashiska and of MaliVai Washington, who reached the men's singles final at Wimbledon in 1996.

Tennis career
As a junior player, Washington won the U.S. Indoor National 18s in 1992, and was a finalist at the U.S. National Hardcourt 16s and US Indoor National 16s in 1991. She turned professional in 1995.

After a slow start to her professional career, Washington's breakthrough year came in 2004 when she broke into the world's top-100 for the first time and then finished the year ranked in the top-50. She recorded her first win against a top-10 player when she defeated Maria Sharapova at New Haven, and reached her first top-level singles final in Tokyo where she lost to Sharapova.

She also came within a hair's breadth of beating Sharapova in the first round of the 2006 French Open. She served for the match at 5–2, but could not hold serve. At 5–4 in the third set, she held match points before the then world No. 4 broke back and won the final set 7–5.

In 2005, she reached the third round at Wimbledon, where Elena Dementieva beat her 7–5, 6–1.

She was a member of the Washington Kastles World TeamTennis squad from 2008–09 and the Boston Lobsters from 2010-12.

Mashona Washington has since retired.

WTA career finals

Singles: 1 runner-up

Doubles: 2 runner-ups

ITF finals

Singles: 12 (2–10)
{|
|-valign=top
|

Doubles: 26 (15–11)

Grand Slam performance timelines

Singles

Doubles

References

External links

 
 

1976 births
Living people
African-American female tennis players
American female tennis players
Sportspeople from Delray Beach, Florida
Sportspeople from Flint, Michigan
Tennis people from Florida
Tennis people from Michigan
21st-century African-American sportspeople
21st-century African-American women
20th-century African-American sportspeople
20th-century African-American women